The 2009–10 season was Ross County's second consecutive season in the Scottish First Division, having been promoted as champions of the Scottish Second Division at the end of 2007–08 season. They also competed in the Challenge Cup, League Cup, and Scottish Cup.

Summary
Ross County finished fifth in the First Division. They did, however, reach the semi-finals of the Challenge Cup,  and the third round of the League Cup. They also managed to gain entrance into the final round of the Scottish Cup, but lost to Dundee United.

Results and fixtures

Scottish First Division

Scottish Challenge Cup

Scottish League Cup

Scottish Cup

Player statistics

Squad 

|}

League table

See also
 List of Ross County F.C. seasons

References

Ross County
Ross County F.C. seasons